The 470 World Championships were held in Thessaloniki, Greece 7–15 July 2017.

Results

Men's 470

Women's 470

References

470 World Championships
470 World Championships
Sailing competitions in Greece
2017 in Greek sport